The hypogeum of Cala Sant Vicenç is a set of caves dating back to the Bronze Age (1,700—1,500 BC), and perhaps the most spectacular hypogeum on Mallorca. Today, eight caves are visible, though when they were studied by Wilfrid James Hemp, there were 15. Some features of the caves are modern (such as the hole at the back of cave 7). The taula-like statue at the entrance to the site is also modern.

References

External links
 Spanish entry on the hypogeum
 Model of Cave 7
 Photographs of the site and site map

Megalithic monuments in Spain
Bronze Age Spain
Prehistory of the Balearic Islands